Commerce Server was a software product for building multichannel e-commerce applications and systems using .NET Framework technology.
The product has changed ownership and names several times. Previously known as Microsoft Commerce Server, it was at the end of the product lifecycle developed, sold, and supported by Sitecore for building multichannel e-commerce applications. It was replaced in 2021 with Sitecore Commerce Cloud. The latest release of the product was Sitecore Commerce Server 11.1, released in October 2014.

Ownership History
The core software that formed the basis for the Commerce Server product line was developed by eShop and purchased by Microsoft in 1996. eShop’s technologies were integrated into Microsoft Merchant Server, which evolved into Microsoft Site Server in 1997,* and eventually to Microsoft Commerce Server in 2000.

In 2007 Microsoft outsourced product development of Commerce Server to Cactus Commerce, which was acquired in 2011 by Ascentium. Ascentium then bought outright the Commerce Server business from Microsoft that same year. In 2012 Ascentium re-branded its company as SMITH and split off the Commerce Server product division into a wholly owned subsidiary known as commerceserver.net.

Sitecore acquired commerceserver.net in late 2013 and released the product as Sitecore Commerce Server in 2014.

Product Description and Components
Sitecore Commerce Server is a set of pre-packaged tools for building and deploying e-commerce websites and e-commerce software applications using .NET Framework technologies. It can be run on-premise or, with the additional support for Microsoft Azure and Amazon Web Services introduced in version 10.1, it can be run in the cloud. Version 11.1 of the Commerce Server codebase is the first built entirely in .NET Framework 4.5 and Visual C++ 2013, eliminating Visual Basic 6 and various Visual C++ runtime dependencies. 

Sitecore Commerce Server has the following components:
Core Systems:
Catalog
Inventory
Order Capture
Discounts
Profiles
Integration Points:
Orders Web Service + BizTalk Adapter
Catalog and Inventory Web Service + BizTalk Adapter
Profiles Web Service + BizTalk Adapter
Marketing Web Service
Desktop Business Tools:
Catalog Manager
Marketing Manager
Customer and Order Manager
Commerce Server Staging
Merchandising Manager (replacement of Catalog Manager)
Sitecore Experience Platform Integration

Related Technologies
Sitecore Commerce Server forms the technology foundation of and is included in Sitecore Commerce, Sitecore's primary commerce offering that also includes Sitecore Commerce Connect. It is marketed and sold as an optional, integrated module of the Sitecore Experience Platform, which also offers other modules for content management, multichannel customer experience management, and big data storage and management.

Product Release History
 1996 - Microsoft Merchant Server 1.0
 1997 - Microsoft Site Server 2.0 
 1998 - Microsoft Site Server 3.0, Commerce Edition
 2000 - Microsoft Commerce Server 2000
 2002 - Microsoft Commerce Server 2002
 Service Pack 2 (2003)
 Service Pack 3 (2004)
 2004 - Microsoft Commerce Server 2002 FP1
 Service Pack 4 (2006)
 2007 - Microsoft Commerce Server 2007
 Service Pack 1 (2008)
 Service Pack 2 (2008)
 2009 - Microsoft Commerce Server 2009
 2011 - Microsoft Commerce Server 2009 R2
 2012 - Ascentium Commerce Server 10
 2014 - Sitecore Commerce Server 11

See also
 Microsoft Servers
 Microsoft Merchant Server
 Microsoft Site Server
 Microsoft Commerce Server

References

External links
 Official website
 Sitecore Commerce Server blog on MSDN
 Sitecore Commerce Server Experts LinkedIn Group

Commerce Server